Urke is a village in the municipality of Ørsta, Møre og Romsdal, Norway.  The village is located on the north shore of the  Norangsfjorden, which is an arm on the east side of the Hjørundfjorden.

The village of Sæbø is nearly due west, on the opposite side of Hjørundfjorden. A car ferry connects the two villages.

Ships serving the Hurtigruten visit Urke daily in the late summer.

References

Villages in Møre og Romsdal
Ørsta